Events from the year 1831 in Scotland.

Incumbents

Law officers 
 Lord Advocate – Francis Jeffrey
 Solicitor General for Scotland – Henry Cockburn

Judiciary 
 Lord President of the Court of Session – Lord Granton
 Lord Justice General – The Duke of Montrose
 Lord Justice Clerk – Lord Boyle

Events 
 Spring – the 12th-century Lewis chessmen are found in a sand-bank on the Isle of Lewis.
 19–21 March – one of Goldsworthy Gurney’s steam road coaches runs from Edinburgh to Glasgow.
 May – Wellington Suspension Bridge over River Dee at Aberdeen opened to all traffic.
 10 May – first steam locomotive to be built in Glasgow completed by Murdoch, Aitken & Co. for the Monkland and Kirkintilloch Railway.
 Mid-May – mineral traffic over Garnkirk and Glasgow Railway commences.
 1 June
 A regular horse-drawn passenger service between Leaend at Airdrie and Glasgow over the Ballochney, Monkland and Kirkintilloch and Garnkirk and Glasgow Railways commences.
 One of Goldsworthy Gurney’s steam road coaches suffers a boiler explosion in Glasgow.
 6 June – first iron steamboat to be launched on the River Clyde, Fairy Queen by John Neilson & Sons.
 4 July – opening of first section of Edinburgh and Dalkeith Railway, from St Leonards to Craighall, including St Leonards Tunnel, Scotland's earliest tunnel on a public railway, and the early cast iron bridge at Braid Burn (erected in March).
 August – the Dugald Stewart Monument in Edinburgh, designed by W. H. Playfair, is completed.
 1 August – the Roman Catholic St Thomas's Church, Keith, is opened for worship.
 27 September – formal opening of Garnkirk and Glasgow Railway: locomotive St Rollox hauls Scotland’s first steam-worked passenger train from the Townhead terminus at Glasgow to Gartsherrie.
 16 December – opening of first section of Dundee and Newtyle Railway, the first public railway in the north of Scotland (horse worked).
 23 December – the second cholera pandemic (1829–51) reaches Scotland.
 The Ardrossan and Johnstone Railway opens as a waggonway from Johnstone to Kilwinning.
 Dunnet Head lighthouse, designed by Robert Stevenson, is built.
 North Church in Aberdeen, designed by John Smith, is opened.
 The Burns Monument, Edinburgh (on Calton Hill), is designed by Thomas Hamilton.
 William Wallace invents the eidograph.
 Glenugie distillery is established as Invernettie at Peterhead by Donald McLeod; Talisker distillery is built at Carbost, Talisker, Skye, by Hugh and Kenneth MacAskill.

Births 
 31 January – Alexander Balmain Bruce, theologian (died 1899)
 February – George Stewart, recipient of the Victoria Cross (died 1868 in England)
 31 March – Archibald Scott Couper, organic chemist (died 1892)
 2 April – David MacGibbon, architect (died 1902)
 26 April – James Donaldson, classical scholar, educationalist and theological writer (died 1915)
 28 April – Peter Tait, mathematical physicist (died 1901)
 7 May – Richard Norman Shaw, architect (died 1912 in England)
 28 May – Richard B. Angus, financier (died 1922 in Canada)
 13 June – James Clerk Maxwell, physicist (died 1879 in England)
 24 June – Robert Wallace, writer and politician (died 1899 in England)
 3 July – Edmund Yates, writer (died 1894 in England)
 18 July – John Skelton, lawyer, author and administrator (died 1897)
 17 August – John McLaren, politician and judge (died 1910)
 13 September – Andrew Noble, physicist (died 1915)
 12 October – Helen Acquroff, pianist, singer, poet and music teacher (died 1887)
 17 October – Isa Craig, née Knox, poet (died 1903 in England)
 23 November – David MacKay, recipient of the Victoria Cross (died 1880)
 25 December – John Bartholomew, cartographer (died 1893)

Deaths 
 14 January – Henry Mackenzie, novelist (born 1745)
 4 February – William Ritchie, newspaper editor (born 1781)
 14 February – Robert Brown, agriculturalist (born 1757)
 22 March – William Symington, engineer and steamboat builder (born 1764; died in London)
 May – James Campbell, army officer (born 1745)
 1 July – Archibald Cochrane, 9th Earl of Dundonald, industrial chemist (born 1748; died in Paris)
 16 August – Sir Hugh Innes, politician (born c. 1764)
 17 August – Patrick Nasmyth, landscape painter (born 1787)
 Joseph Lowe, economist

The arts
 James Hogg publishes Songs, by the Ettrick Shepherd.
 The Literary and Commercial Society of Glasgow is last known to be active.

See also 

 1831 in the United Kingdom

References 

 
Scotland
1830s in Scotland